Mammillaria brachytrichion is a species of plant in the family Cactaceae. It is endemic to Mexico.

Its natural habitat is hot deserts.

References

brachytrichion
Cacti of Mexico
Endemic flora of Mexico
Critically endangered plants
Taxonomy articles created by Polbot